Luna is a Bantu language of eastern Democratic Republic of the Congo. Assigned by Guthrie to a group called Songe (L.20), it is presumably one of the Luban languages established by Ahmed (1995), like most of the other Songe languages, though it was not specifically addressed.  Ruhlen (1987) agrees in placing it with the Luban languages.

References 

Luban languages
Languages of the Democratic Republic of the Congo